Ethmiopsis heppneri is a moth in the family Gelechiidae. It was described by Kyu-Tek Park in 1995. It is found in Taiwan.

References

Ethmiopsis
Moths described in 1995